Mutya ng Pilipinas 2014 was the 46th edition of Mutya ng Pilipinas. It was held at the Solaire Resort and Casino in Parañaque, Metro Manila, Philippines ON August 8, 2014.

At the end of the event, Koreen Medina crowned Eva Psychee Patalinjug as Mutya ng Pilipinas Asia Pacific International 2014, Angeli Dione Gomez crowned Glennifer Perido as Mutya ng Pilipinas Tourism International 2014, and Asdis Lisa Karlsdottir crowned Patrizia Bosco as Mutya ng Pilipinas Overseas Communities 2014. Cristine Racel was named First Runner-Up, while Kim Fyfe was named Second Runner-Up.

Results
Color keys

Special Title

Special Awards I

Special Awards II

The 30 Official Contestants

*The Official Delegates were screened/auditioned at an open casting at various cities in the country and abroad.

Crossovers from Major National Pageants prior to this date
 Mutya #9 Cristine Racel of Olongapo City was Slimmers World Miss Bikini Philippines 2013 1st runner-up
 Mutya #16 Christina De Vries of Toronto, Canada was Miss United Continents 2013 Philippine representative
 Mutya #26 Glennifer Perido of the Cordilleras was Binibining Pilipinas 2011 candidate and Miss Philippines Earth 2012 Miss Air / 1st runner-up

References

External links
 Official Mutya ng Pilipinas website
 Mutya ng Pilipinas 2014 is on!
 Mutya ng Pilipinas on Facebook

2014
2014 beauty pageants
2014 in the Philippines